SSRS may refer to:

 Savez Sindikata Republike Srpske, the Confederation of Trade Unions of the Republika Srpska
 Ship Security Reporting System, a counter piracy system
 SQL Server Reporting Services, a server-based report generation software system from Microsoft
 Swedish Sea Rescue Society, a Swedish search and rescue organization
 Sri Sri Ravi Shankar, Indian spiritual leader
 Barreirinhas Airport, serving Barreirinhas, Brazil, ICAO airport code SSRS